Orange Crush is a carbonated soft drink brand, originally marketed as an orange soda, now with various flavors of Crush.

Orange Crush may also refer to:

Literature
Orange Crush (novel), by Tim Dorsey (2001)
Orange Crush, book by poet Simone Muench (2010)

Sport
Orange Crush Defense, a nickname for the 1970s defense of the Denver Broncos American football team
Orange Crush, a vertical suplex powerbomb throw in professional wrestling, as coined by Kenta Kobashi
Orange Crush, Rage City Rollergirls's B-team
Orange Crush, Dutchland Rollers's C-team
"Orange Crush", a term used by Gamecock Football fans to describe a final stretch against Tennessee, Florida, and Clemson
Andy Miller (harness racing) (born 1968), harness racing driver nicknamed "Orange Crush"

Music
Orange Crush, a series of guitar amplifiers produced by the Orange Music Electronic Company
"Orange Crush" (song), a 1988 song by R.E.M. where "Orange Crush" refers to Agent Orange
"Orange Crush", song by Stefy on The Orange Album (2006)

Other uses
Orange Crush interchange, a freeway interchange in the City of Orange, California, U.S.
Petroleum hydroxide or "orange crush", a graffiti-removing chemical
"Orange Crush", the rise in popularity of the New Democratic Party in the 2011 Canadian federal election
"Orange Crush", a cocktail composed of vodka, orange liqueur, navel orange and lemon-lime soda

See also
Orange Krush, a student rooting section and charity at the University of Illinois at Urbana-Champaign